There are over 9,000 Grade I listed buildings in England.  This page is a list of these buildings in the district of Tewkesbury in Gloucestershire.

Tewkesbury

|}

See also
 Grade II* listed buildings in Tewkesbury (borough)

Notes

References 
National Heritage List for England

External links

Tewkesbury
Tewkesbury
Grade I